Yousri Belgaroui (born 2 June 1992) is a Tunisian-Dutch kickboxer and mixed martial artist who competes in the middleweight division of Glory, where he is former three-time Glory Middleweight Championship challenger. 

He was ranked as a top ten middleweight by Combat Press between November 2021 and March 2022, peaking at #2

Personal life
Belgaroui was born in Amsterdam to a Tunisian father and a Dutch mother. He holds a degree in Public Governance and Management from the University of Amsterdam. He works as a commentator for Veronica TV.

Kickboxing career
In 2016 Belgaroui entered the Glory Middleweight Contender's Tournament, held at Glory 34: Denver on October 21, 2016. In the semi finals, he won a unanimous decision over Ariel Machado, but lost a split decision to Israel Adesanya in the tournament finals.

Yousri entered the 2017 Middleweight Contender Tournament as well, which was held at Glory 40: Copenhagen on April 29, 2017, and was booked to face Agron Preteni in the semifinals. He beat Preteni by a unanimous decision, and faced the future champion Alex Pereira in the tournament finals. Belgaroui won the fight by a unanimous decision.

After his tournament win, Yousri faced Jason Wilnis at Glory 45: Amsterdam on July 30, 2017. He won in the first round due to doctor's stoppage.

Belgaroui challenged Alex Pereira for the Glory Middleweight Championship at Glory 49: Rotterdam on December 9, 2017. Pereira won the fight by a third-round technical knockout. 

In his next match, at Glory 53: Lille on May 12, 2018, Belgaroui beat Dawid Kasperski by a second-round technical knockout. This earned him the chance to once again fight for the Glory Middleweight Championship, as he was scheduled to face Perira at Glory 55: New York on July 20, 2018. Pereira won the fight by a first-round knockout.

Belgaroui bounced back with a first-round knockout of Yassine Ahaggan at Glory 60: Lyon on October 20, 2018, but would lose a unanimous decision to Donovan Wisse at Glory 65: Utrecht on May 17, 2019, in his very next fight. Yousri won his next fights against Ulric Bokeme at Glory 69: Düsseldorf by unanimous decision, and against Jakob Styben at Glory 75: Utrecht by a second-round technical knockout.

Belgaroui was scheduled to fight Donovan Wisse at Glory 78: Rotterdam on September 4, 2021, for the vacant Glory Middleweight Championship. He lost the fight by a third-round technical knockout.

Mixed martial arts career 
Belgaroui made his MMA debut at UAE Warriors Arabia, being scheduled to fight Badreddine Diani. He won the fight by a unanimous decision. He was next scheduled to fight Sallah-Eddine Dekhissi at UAE Warriors 17, three months after his professional debut. He won the fight by knockout in the first round.

Belgaroui was expected to face Mohamad Osseili at UAE Warriors 23: Arabia 5 on August 28, 2021. The fight was later cancelled for undisclosed reasons. Belgaroui was booked to face Ahmed Sami at UAE Warriors 25: Africa on February 25, 2022. He lost the fight by split decision.

Belgaroui was booked to face Samir Zaidi at UAE Warriors 27 on March 25, 2022. He won the bout via TKO stoppage in the first round. Belgaroui faced Mohamad Osseili at UAE Warriors 31 on July 3, 2022, in his second fight of the year. He lost the bout via unanimous decision.

Belgaroui faced Bogdan Kotlovyanov at Levels Fight League 7 on February 5, 2023. He won the fight by a first-round knockout.

Less then a month later, Belgaroui faced Stefan Pretorius on February 24, 2023 at UAE Warriors 35, winning the bout via TKO stoppage in the second round.

Championships and awards

Kickboxing 
Glory 
2017 Glory Middleweight (-85 kg/187.4 lb) Contender Tournament Winner
International Ringsports Organisation
IRO European Middleweight (-86 kg) Championship

Mixed martial arts record

|-
|Win
|align=center|5-2
|Stefan Pretorius
|TKO (knee and punches)
|UAE Warriors 35
|
|align=center|2
|align=center|0:43
|Abu Dhabi, United Arab Emirates
|
|-
|Win
|align=center|4–2
|Bogdan Kotlovyanov
|KO (punch to the body)
|Levels Fight League 7
|
|align=center|1
|align=center|1:50
|Amsterdam, Netherlands
|
|-
|Loss
|align=center|3–2
|Mohamad Osseili
|Decision (unanimous) 
|UAE Warriors 31
|
|align=center|3
|align=center|5:00
|Abu Dhabi, United Arab Emirates
|
|-
| Win
| align=center|3–1
| Samir Zaidi
| TKO (punches)
|UAE Warriors 27
|
|align=center|1
|align=center|4:32
|Abu Dhabi, United Arab Emirates
|
|-
| Loss
| align=center|2–1
| Ahmed Sami
| Decision (split)
|UAE Warriors 25
|
|align=center|3
|align=center|5:00
|Abu Dhabi, United Arab Emirates
|
|-
| Win
| align=center|2–0
| Sallah-Eddine Dekhissi
| KO (head kick & punches)
|UAE Warriors 17
|
|align=center|1
|align=center|2:44
|Abu Dhabi, United Arab Emirates
|
|-
|Win
|align=center|1–0
|Badreddine Diani
|Decision (unanimous)
|UAE Warriors Arabia
|
|align=center|3
|align=center|5:00
|Abu Dhabi, United Arab Emirates
|
|-

Kickboxing record

|- style="background:#fbb;"
| 2021-09-04 || Loss||align=left| Donovan Wisse || Glory 78: Arnhem || Arnhem, Netherlands || TKO (Doctor Stoppage) || 3 || 2:10
|-
! style=background:white colspan=9 |
|- style="background:#cfc;"
|  2020-02-29 || Win || align="left" | Jakob Styben || Glory 75: Utrecht || Utrecht, Netherlands || TKO (Doctor Stoppage) || 2 || 1:02
|-  bgcolor="#CCFFCC"
| 2019-10-12 || Win ||align=left| Ulric Bokeme || Glory 69: Düsseldorf || Germany || Decision (Unanimous) || 3 || 3:00
|-  bgcolor="#FFBBBB"
| 2019-05-17 || Loss ||align=left| Donovan Wisse || Glory 65: Utrecht  || Netherlands || Decision (Unanimous) || 3 ||  3:00
|-  bgcolor="#CCFFCC"
| 2018-10-20|| Win ||align=left|  Yassine Ahaggan || Glory 60: Lyon || Lyon, France || KO (Knee to the body)|| 1 || 1:22
|-  bgcolor="#FFBBBB"
| 2018-07-20 || Loss ||align=left| Alex Pereira || Glory 55: New York  || New York City || KO (Right hook) || 1 ||  2:16
|-
! style=background:white colspan=9 |
|-  bgcolor="#CCFFCC"
| 2018-05-12 || Win||align=left| Dawid Kasperski || Glory 53: Lille  || Lille, France || TKO (3 Knockdowns Rule) || 2 ||  1:16
|-  bgcolor="#FFBBBB"
| 2017-12-09 || Loss ||align=left| Alex Pereira || Glory 49: Rotterdam || Rotterdam, Netherlands  || TKO (Cut)  || 3 || 1:52
|-
! style=background:white colspan=9 |
|-  bgcolor="#CCFFCC"
| 2017-07-30|| Win ||align=left| Jason Wilnis || Glory 45: Amsterdam || Amsterdam, Netherlands || TKO (Cut) || 1 || 2:47
|-  bgcolor="#CCFFCC"
| 2017-04-29 || Win ||align=left| Alex Pereira || Glory 40: Copenhagen - Middleweight Contender Tournament, Final || Copenhagen, Denmark || Decision (Unanimous) || 3 || 3:00
|-
! style=background:white colspan=9 |
|- 
|-  bgcolor="#CCFFCC"
| 2017-04-29 || Win ||align=left| Agron Preteni || Glory 40: Copenhagen - Middleweight Contender Tournament, Semi Finals || Copenhagen, Denmark || Decision (Unanimous) || 3 || 3:00
|- 
|-  bgcolor="#FFBBBB"
| 2016-10-21 || Loss ||align=left| Israel Adesanya || Glory 34: Denver - Middleweight Contender Tournament, Final || Broomfield, Colorado, USA || Decision (Split) || 3 || 3:00
|-
! style=background:white colspan=9 |
|- 
|-  bgcolor="#CCFFCC"
| 2016-10-21 || Win ||align=left| Ariel Machado || Glory 34: Denver - Middleweight Contender Tournament, Semi Finals || Broomfield, Colorado, USA || Decision (Unanimous) || 3 || 3:00

|- bgcolor="#fbb"
| 2016-08-23 || Loss||align=left| Dzianis Hancharonak || Akhmat Fight Show || Grozny, Russia || Decision (unanimous) || 3 || 3:00

|-  bgcolor="#FFBBBB"
| 2016-08-06 || Loss ||align=left| Israel Adesanya|| Glory of Heroes 4 || Changzhi, China || Decision (unanimous) || 3 || 3:00
|-
|-  bgcolor="#CCFFCC"
| 2016-07-02 || Win ||align=left| Sebastian Ciobanu || Respect World Series 2 || London, England || KO (High knee) || 1 || 1:02
|-
|-  bgcolor="#CCFFCC"
|2016-05-25
|Win
|align=left| Sergio Eckhart
|Enfusion Live Presents Push It To The Limit
|Amsterdam, Netherlands
|KO (Punches)
|2
|0:56
|-
|-  bgcolor="#CCFFCC"
|2016-03-05
|Win
|align=left| Hovik Tikrajan
|Fight League, The Battle
|Hoofddorp, Netherlands
|KO (Knee)
|1
|1:12
|-
|-  bgcolor="#CCFFCC"
|2016-02-07
|Win
|align=left| Henry Akdeniz
|Back To The Oldschool, Zonnehuis
|Amsterdam, Netherlands
|KO (Punches)
|3
|1:15
|-
|-  bgcolor="#CCFFCC"
|2015-11-28
|Win
|align=left| Jeffrey Ijdo
|Enfusion Live Presents Fightsense
|The Hague, Netherlands
|KO (Body knee)
|1
|2:03
|-
|-  bgcolor="#CCFFCC"
|2015-10-24
|Win
|align=left| Zakaria Khelil
|IRO European Championship
|Drachten, Netherlands
|KO (Body knee)
|1
|0:31
|-
! style=background:white colspan=9 |
|-
|-  bgcolor="#CCFFCC"
| 2015-10-02 || Win ||align=left| Dumitru Țopai || SUPERKOMBAT World Grand Prix 2015 Final Elimination || Milan, Italy || Decision (Unanimous) || 3 || 3:00
|-
|-  bgcolor="#CCFFCC"
|2015-04-18
|Win
|align=left| Alcorac Caballero Lopez
|Enfusion Live #27
|Tenerife, Spain
|Decision (Unanimous)
|3
|  3:00
|-  bgcolor="#CCFFCC"
|2015-04-04
|Win
|align=left| Tagir Bokov
|Enfusion Talents #8
|The Hague, Netherlands
|TKO
|1
| 
|-
| colspan=9 | Legend:

See also 
List of male kickboxers

References

External links
Profile at GLORY

Living people
1992 births
Middleweight kickboxers
Dutch male kickboxers
Tunisian male kickboxers
Dutch people of Tunisian descent
Glory kickboxers
SUPERKOMBAT kickboxers
Dutch male mixed martial artists
Tunisian male mixed martial artists
Mixed martial artists utilizing kickboxing